Strigoi is a 2009 British comedy horror film directed by Faye Jackson and starring Constantin Bărbulescu, Camelia Maxim, and Rudi Rosenfeld. Based on Romanian mythology, the film involves Romanian vampires, which are referred to as "strigoi".

Premise

After failing to establish himself abroad as a doctor, Vlad returns home to Romania, where he becomes convinced that his village is subject to vampire attacks.

Cast
 Constantin Bărbulescu as Constantin Tirescu
 Adrian Donea as Mara's Husband
 Zane Jarcu as Stefan (The Mayor)
 Vlad Jipa as Octav (The Policeman)
 Camelia Maxim as Mara Tomsa
 Cătălin Paraschiv as Vlad Cozma
 Dan Popa as Tudor (The Priest)
 Rudi Rosenfeld as Nicolae Cozma (Vlad's Grandfather)

Release
Strigoi debuted on 17 August 2009 at the Toronto After Dark Film Festival and opened in other film festivals on the dates given below.

Reception
Dennis Harvey of Variety called it "often drolly funny if a tad long-winded ... a witty and unpredictable upending of genre tropes".  Bloody Disgusting rated it 3.5/5 stars and wrote, "While the overall relaxed tone sometimes slows the pace, satire and dramatic moments fill any voids."  Kurt Halfyard of Twitch Film, in comparing it to contemporary vampire films, wrote that it is more akin to an art-house film that eschews shallow exploitation in favor of occasionally gory metaphor about Romania's history.

Accolades
Strigoi earned various awards in categories ranging from recognition of the film itself to its screenplay, direction and editing, to the performance of the lead actors.

References

External links

2009 films
British comedy horror films
English-language Romanian films
Films set in Romania
Films shot in Romania
Romanian comedy horror films
British vampire films
British supernatural horror films
2000s English-language films
Romanian supernatural horror films
2000s supernatural horror films
2000s British films
Romanian folk culture